Takayo (written: ,  or ) is a feminine Japanese given name. Notable people with the name include:

Takayo Fischer (born 1932), American actress
, Japanese mixed martial artist
, Japanese pole vaulter
, Japanese swimmer
, Japanese actress

Japanese feminine given names